Westcott House may refer to:

 Westcott House (Springfield, Ohio), designed by Frank Lloyd Wright, NRHP-listed
 Westcott House, Cambridge, Anglican theological college in England
 William Westcott House, Orange Park, Florida, listed on the NRHP in Florida
 Nathan Westcott House, Cranston, Rhode Island, listed on the NRHP in Rhode Island

See also
 Westcott Stock Farm, Centerville, Indiana, listed on the National Register of Historic Places in Wayne County, Indiana